Åge Storhaug (5 April 1938 – 18 April 2012) was a Norwegian gymnast who competed from the late 1950s to the early 1970s.

He was born in Klepp and represented the club Klepp IL. He participated at the 1960 Summer Olympics and at the 1964 Summer Olympics. He won several Norwegian championships and Nordic championships. He coached the Norwegian national gymnastics team from 1973 to 1983.

He also participated in athletics, and had decent results in the pole vault and hurdles.

He died in 2012. He was a brother of politician Lars Storhaug.

Works
Med helskru! (1966)

References

External links

1938 births
2012 deaths
People from Klepp
Norwegian male artistic gymnasts
Norwegian sports coaches
Gymnasts at the 1960 Summer Olympics
Gymnasts at the 1964 Summer Olympics
Olympic gymnasts of Norway
Sportspeople from Rogaland
20th-century Norwegian people